Phrissura is a genus of butterflies in the family Pieridae. The genus is monotypic containing the single species Phrissura aegis.

The following subspecies are recognized:
P. a. aegis Philippines (Mindanao)
P. a. illana (C. & R. Felder, 1862) Philippines (Luzon)
P. a. cynis (Hewitson, [1866]) Peninsular Malaya
P. a. pryeri (Distant, 1885) Pulau Tioman, Pulau Aur
P. a. caepia Fruhstorfer Philippines (Palawan)
P. a. gerasa Fruhstorfer, 1910 Sula Island
P. a. polisma (Hewitson, [1861]) North Sulawesi
P. a. aegina Fruhstorfer, 1899 South Sulawesi

References

External links
images representing Phrissura  at Consortium for the Barcode of Life

Pierini
Monotypic butterfly genera
Taxa named by Arthur Gardiner Butler
Pieridae genera